This is a list of lakes in Hunan.

List

References